Machismo is the funk group Cameo's 1988 follow up to their album Word Up!. It includes the hits "You Make Me Work" and "Skin I'm In". The album reached No. 10 on the Billboard R&B chart, No. 56 on the Billboard 200 Pop Albums chart, and No. 86 on the UK albums chart. It was certified Gold by the RIAA for sales of over 500,000 copies.

Critical reception

Chris Heim of the Chicago Tribune placed Machismo at No. 6 on his list of the top 10 albums of 1988.

Track listing
 "You Make Me Work" – 6:08
 "I Like the World" – 6:14
 "Promiscuous" – 4:33
 "In the Night" – (with Miles Davis) – 4:43
 "Skin I'm In" – 6:25
 "Pretty Girls" – 4:59
 "Honey" – 2:07
 "Soul Tightened" – 4:39
 "DKWIG" – 4:37

Personnel
Backing vocals – Charlie Singleton, Larry Blackmon, Michael Burnett, Nathan Leftenant, Tomi Jenkins, Willie Morris
Bass guitar – Aaron Mills, Kenny Burke, Larry Blackmon, Michael Burnett
Drum programming – Merv De Peyer, Sammy Merendino
Drums – Larry Blackmon
Guitar – Charlie Singleton, Jean Beauvoir, Lenny Williams, Little Steven, Mike Dino Campbell
Horn – Uptown Horns
Keyboards – Bernard Wright, Eric Rehl, Kevin Kendricks, Merv De Peyer, Randy Stern
Lead vocals – Larry Blackmon, Tomi Jenkins
Percussion – Larry Blackmon
Producer – Larry Blackmon
Saxophone – Arnett Leftenant, Dave Tofani, Kenny Garrett, Maceo Parker, Michael Brecker
Trombone – Fred Wesley
Trumpet – Alan Rubin, Randy Brecker, Miles Davis
Recording engineer – Craig Vogel

Chart positions

Singles
"You Make Me Work" – released September 1988
"Skin I'm In" – released December 1988
"Pretty Girls" - released May 1989

References

Cameo (band) albums
1988 albums